The Merry Drinker is an oil on canvas painting by Dutch artist Frans Hals, from c. 1628–1630. The painting has dimensions of 81 by 66.5 centimeters. It is in the collection of the Rijksmuseum, in Amsterdam.

Analysis
The painting shows a man wearing a leather jerkin, lace collar and cuffs, and a floppy hat tipped at an angle. He is gesturing with his right hand and holding a glass of white wine in his left hand. He seems caught in a moment of discussion with the viewer. A medallion dangles from his neck chain, which Hofstede de Groot claimed was a likeness of Prince Maurice of Orange.  Various experts have claimed the painting represents the sense of taste. In old Dutch inventories, the theme of a "merry drinker" or "jolly toper" occurs often, and this was probably not a portrait but meant as a genre piece.

References

Sources
 Frans Hals, a catalogue raisonné of Hals works by Seymour Slive: Volume Three, the catalogue, National gallery of Art: Kress Foundation, Studies in the History of European Art, London - Phaidon Press, 1974

1630 paintings
Paintings by Frans Hals
Paintings in the collection of the Rijksmuseum
Food and drink paintings
Portraits of men